Pirne Peak is the rocky peak rising to 802 m on the coast of Vaughan Inlet, at the northeast extremity of Rugate Ridge on Oscar II Coast in Graham Land.  It surmounts Green Glacier to the northwest and Musina Glacier to the southwest.  The feature is named after the settlement of Pirne in Southeastern Bulgaria.

Location
British mapping in 1978.

Maps
 British Antarctic Territory.  Scale 1:200000 topographic map.  DOS 610 Series, Sheet W 64 60.  Directorate of Overseas Surveys, Tolworth, UK, 1978.
 Antarctic Digital Database (ADD). Scale 1:250000 topographic map of Antarctica. Scientific Committee on Antarctic Research (SCAR). Since 1993, regularly upgraded and updated.

Notes

References
 Pirne Peak. SCAR Composite Antarctic Gazetteer.
 Bulgarian Antarctic Gazetteer. Antarctic Place-names Commission. (details in Bulgarian, basic data in English)

External links
 Pirne Peak. Copernix satellite image

Mountains of Graham Land
Oscar II Coast
Bulgaria and the Antarctic